Dechloromonas denitrificans is a gram negative, N2O-producing motile bacterium with a polar flagellum from the genus of Dechloromonas which was isolated from the earthworm Aporrectodea caliginosa. Colonies of Dechloromonas denitrificans are yellowish colored.

References

External links
Type strain of Dechloromonas denitrificans at BacDive -  the Bacterial Diversity Metadatabase

Rhodocyclaceae
Bacteria described in 2005